Hoptivka is a selo in Kharkiv Raion, Kharkiv Oblast, Ukraine and a northeastern border crossing with Russia. It belongs to Derhachi urban hromada, one of the hromadas of Ukraine. 

The M2 highway is the primary border crossing, which meets the M20 in Ukraine.

Until 18 July 2020, Hoptivka belonged to Derhachi Raion. The raion was abolished in July 2020 as part of the administrative reform of Ukraine, which reduced the number of raions of Kharkiv Oblast to seven. The area of Derhachi Raion was merged into Kharkiv Raion.

It was captured by Russia in its war with Ukraine on or about 25 February 2022, and re-captured by Ukrainian military forces on or about 11 September 2022.

References

Villages in Kharkiv Raion